Dilliwaali Girlfriend is a Hindi song from the 2013 Bollywood film, Yeh Jawaani Hai Deewani. Composed by Pritam Chakraborty, the song is sung by Arijit Singh and Sunidhi Chauhan, with lyrics penned by Kumaar. The music video of the track features actors Ranbir Kapoor and Deepika Padukone.

Background 
The song is composed by Pritam, having a mix of Punjabi beats and contemporary music with a Delhi flavour to it. The lyrics are penned by Kumaar. When he met Pritam, he expressed a wish to "write something" where Pritam asked Kumaar to write for the melody of this song. On instant hearing, director of the film Ayan Mukerji wanted the song, since it was perfect for the situation in his mind.

The music video features Ranbir Kapoor and Deepika Padukone. In the song, Padukone wears a red choli and a matching red lehenga with side slit, while Kapoor wears a grey kurta pyjama. Kalki Koechlin and Aditya Roy Kapoor join in at the end of the video with some desi moves. The song is choreographed by Ganesh Acharya. The song is mixed by Eric Pillai and assisted by Michael Edwin Pillai.

Release 
The music video of the song was officially released on 26 April 2013, through the YouTube channel of T-Series. The full song was later released along with other tracks of the album on 29 April 2013. The music video is the third song released from the film after "Badtameez Dil" and "Balam Pichkari". The song was released with the tagline "Bunny has broken the signals, started saving up, bid good bye to his family & even left his Dilliwaali Girlfriend... All for Naina".

Response 
The song was included in "The Best Dance Moves of 2013" published by Koimoi. The song was positioned at four in the list of "Best dance numbers of 2013" published by The Times of India on 29 July 2014.

Critical reception 
Bollywood Hungama's Rajiv Vijayakar found the blend of English, Hindi and unadulterated irreverence, a clever work by Kumaar and further stated "Here's where a different Arijit Singh, along with the seasoned Sunidhi Chauhan, keeps the track on a high keel".

Mohar Basu from Koimoi criticise the lyrics by Kumaar and felt that Singh was "unceremoniously wasted" in this song and Chauhan's "unsurpassable energy" too fails in this one.

Live performance 
Arijit Singh performed the song live in his London debut concert at the Indigo Arena on 29 August 2014, as part of his "Tum Hi Ho UK tour". Sunidhi Chauhan performed the song in her concert at Emirates Palace in August 2014. She also performed the song during her UK tour concert at Royal Albert Hall on 1 October 2013.

Apart from the live performances by the artists at concerts, the song was used in many dancing platforms. Valerie Rockey and Ricky Ubeda performed the song on Season 11 of So You Think You Can Dance, choreographed by Nakul Dev Mahajan on 23 July 2014.

Nominations

References

External links 

Hindi songs
Hindi film songs
Arijit Singh songs
Sunidhi Chauhan songs
Songs written for films
2013 songs
Songs with music by Pritam Chakraborty
Songs with lyrics by Kumaar